Aleš Křeček (born 26 December 1971) is a Czech former football player and current manager of the Czech Republic U-20.

He was appointed manager of Czech 2. Liga side Slovan Varnsdorf in August 2010. In September 2011, Křeček left his position at Varnsdorf to take over at Slovak side Ružomberok.

Křeček was named as the new manager of Zlín in May 2012. He lasted until October 2012 with the club languishing two points above the relegation zone after nine matches, when the club decided to bring back former manager Marek Kalivoda.

References

External links
 Profile at iDNES.cz 

1971 births
Living people
Czech footballers
Czechoslovak footballers
Czech football managers
Czech First League managers
FC Zbrojovka Brno managers
FK Varnsdorf managers
FC Fastav Zlín managers
Slovak Super Liga managers
MFK Ružomberok managers
Expatriate football managers in Slovakia
Association footballers not categorized by position
FK Ústí nad Labem managers
Czech expatriate sportspeople in Slovakia
Czech National Football League managers